"Some Say" is a song by Canadian rock band Sum 41. It was released in February 2005 as the third single from their 2004 album, Chuck. It was released in Canada and Japan only and had an accompanying music video. "No Reason" was released instead in the US and Europe.

Song information
While playing it live on the Go Chuck Yourself live album, band member Deryck Whibley says "this song is about your very, very, very confused parents."

Music video
The music video starts out with the band members in a car, everyone but Whibley exits, and he starts singing. The video also features reverse editing of people doing various things, such as accidentally dropping groceries, with shots of the band in between, in the end of the video soldiers rush people away from doing mundane things such as grilling steak and sitting on a couch, while the rest of the band walks back to the car Whibley is still in the car singing and they drive off.	
The set that was used for this video bares some resemblance to the one used in the movie Dogville by Lars von Trier, where there aren't any walls, and the floor has lines that indicate the different spaces.
Other than the final scene showing the band driving away, the video is shot in one continuous shot. This was the last music video until the release of "Fake My Own Death" to feature guitarist Dave Baksh.

Track listing

Promo CD

Charts

References

External links

2005 singles
Sum 41 songs
Rock ballads
2004 songs
Island Records singles
Songs written by Deryck Whibley
Songs written by Greig Nori